The Cape Verdean Football Federation is the governing body of football in Cape Verde. It was founded in 1982, affiliated to FIFA in 1986 and to CAF in 2000. It organizes the national football league and the national team.

Its current president is Victor Osório since 2015.

The federation is headquartered in the capital city of Praia and is located on Avenida Cidade de Lisboa in the subdivision of Várzea where the sport complexes are located.

Its office is just south of Estádio da Várzea and features a small field on the east part.  The building was completed in 2006 after the nearby stadium was also repaired.  Since 2013, the Caixa building is adjacent to its offices.

Premier League or Interisland league

The Capeverdean Premier division are made up of two groups, Groups A and B and the team with the most points in the island but Santiago and Santo Antão are divided into two zones in the island qualifies into the premier division and not the top teams from the second or third divisions in other places.  There are only about five to six rounds before heading to the playoffs and are played in the months of May or June.

The premier league as well as the island divisions has several teams, more teams can be seen at another title below this one:

Cutelin dos Mosteiros Trás - Fogo
Nô Pintcha Mosteiros - Fogo
Grito Povo de Ribeira do Ilheu - Fogo
ABC de Patim - Fogo
Académica (Praia) - Praia
Académica (Mindelo) - Mindelo
Académica Sal-Rei - Sal-Rei
Académico do Aeroporto - Espargos on Sal Island
Académica (Espargos) - Espargos on Sal Island
Académico Sal Rei - Sal Rei on Boa Vista Island
GD Amarantes
Barreirense
África Show - Boa Vista
SC Atlético
Botafogo
Castilho - Mindelo
Derby FC - Mindelo
Juventude - Fogo
CS Mindelense - Mindelo
No Pintcha - Brava
Onze Unidos - Vila do Maio
Sal-Rei - Sal Rei
Sanantonense? - Santo Antão
Sanjoanense?
Sport Club Santa Maria - Santa Maria in the island of Sal
Spartak d'Aguadinha - Fogo
Sporting Clube do Porto Novo - Porto Novo
Sporting Praia - Praia
Tchadense - Praia
CD Travadores - Praia
Ultramarina - São Nicolau
União - Fogo
Unidos do Norte - Paiol, Ponta d'Água Achada São Filipe, Praia
Verdun
Vulcânicos - Fogo

Island Leagues including the two zones of Santiago and Santo Antão

Unlike other leagues throughout the world in which is the second, third and fourth, the lowest is mainly the second division or secondary leagues and are split into ten leagues of which are played in the nine  main islands, Santiago and Santo Antão is split into two, the North Zone and the South Zone; the tenth main island of Santa Luzia is uninhabited. The team of each league with the most points qualifies and advances into the premier division. One of these examples includes these islands and zones. In the 2005-06 season, the Santiago North Zone did not have a champion which meant that the champion of the previous season automatically entered the premier division:
 Boa Vista:
 Académica Sal-Rei, Académica Operária, África Show, Sal-Rei
 Brava:
 Académica, Benfica, Corôa, Morabeza, No Pintcha, Sporting
 Fogo:
 ABC, Cutelinho, Juventude, No Pintcha do Mosteiros, Spartak, União, Vulcânicos
 Maio:
 Barreirense?, Onze Unidos
 Sal
 Académico do Aeroporto, Académica (Espargos), Juventude, Palmeira, Santa Maria, Verdun
 São Nicolau:
 SC Atletico, FC Ultramarina, Desportivo Ribeira Brava
 Santiago (South Zone):
 Académica, Boavista, Praia Rural, Sporting Praia, Tchadense, CD Travadores, FC Ultramarina, etc.
 Santo Antão (South Zone):
 Sporting Clube do Porto Novo
 São Vicente:
 Académica (Mindelo), Castilho, FC Derby, CS Mindelense, etc.

The island divisions including the two islands' two zones varies from each month that play and plays in the month of April and May and May in most islands, Santiago begins from December until May.

References

External links
  Official site

Cape Verde
Football in Cape Verde
Football
Sports organizations established in 1982
1982 establishments in Cape Verde
Sport in Praia
Buildings and structures in Praia
Várzea, Praia